The 2003 Omloop Het Volk was the 57th edition of the Omloop Het Volk cycle race and was held on 1 March 2003. The race started in Ghent and finished in Lokeren. The race was won by Johan Museeuw.

General classification

References

2003
Omloop Het Nieuwsblad
Omloop Het Nieuwsblad
March 2003 sports events in Europe